In computer science, a sparse file is a type of computer file that attempts to use file system space more efficiently when the file itself is partially empty. This is achieved by writing brief information (metadata) representing the empty blocks to the data storage media instead of the actual "empty" space which makes up the block, thus consuming less storage space. The full block size is written to the media as the actual size only when the block contains "real" (non-empty) data.

When reading sparse files, the file system transparently converts metadata representing empty blocks into "real" blocks filled with null bytes at runtime. The application is unaware of this conversion.

Most modern file systems support sparse files, including most Unix variants and NTFS. Apple's HFS+ does not provide support for sparse files, but in OS X, the virtual file system layer supports storing them in any supported file system, including HFS+. Apple File System (APFS), announced in June 2016 at WWDC, also supports them. Sparse files are commonly used for disk images, database snapshots, log files and in scientific applications.

Advantages
The advantage of sparse files is that storage space is only allocated when actually needed: Storage capacity is conserved, and large files can occasionally be created even if insufficient free space for the original file is available on the storage media. This also reduces the time of the first write as the system does not have to allocate blocks for the "skipped" space. If the initial allocation requires writing all zeros to the space, it also keeps the system from having to write over the "skipped" space twice.

For example, a virtual machine image with max size of 100 GB that has 2 GB of files actually written would require the full 100 GB when backed by pre-allocated storage, yet only 2 GB on a sparse file. If the file system supports hole punching and the guest operating system issues TRIM commands, deleting files on the guest will accordingly reduce the space needed.

Disadvantages
Disadvantages are that sparse files may become fragmented; file system free space reports may be misleading; filling up file systems containing sparse files can have unexpected effects (such as disk-full or quota-exceeded errors when merely overwriting an existing portion of a file that happened to have been sparse); and copying a sparse file with a program that does not explicitly support them may copy the entire, uncompressed size of the file, including the zero sections which are not allocated on the storage media—losing the benefits of the sparse property in the file. Sparse files are also not fully supported by all backup software or applications. However, the VFS implementation sidesteps  the prior two disadvantages. Loading executables on 32 bit Windows (exe or dll) which are sparse takes a much longer time since the file cannot be memory mapped in the limited 4 GB address space, and are not cached as there is no codepath for caching 32 bit sparse executables (Windows on 64 bit architectures can map sparse executables). On NTFS sparse files (or rather their non-zero areas) cannot be compressed. NTFS implements sparseness as a special kind of compression so a file may be either sparse or compressed.

Sparse files in Unix
Sparse files are typically handled transparently to the user. But the differences between a normal file and sparse file become apparent in some situations.

Creation
The Unix command
dd of=sparse-file bs=5M seek=1 count=0
will create a file of five mebibytes in size, but with no data stored on the media (only metadata). (GNU dd has this behavior because it calls ftruncate to set the file size; other implementations may merely create an empty file.)

Similarly the truncate command may be used, if available:
truncate -s 5M <filename>

On Linux, an existing file can be converted to sparse by:
fallocate -d <filename>

There is no portable system call to punch holes; Linux provides fallocate(FALLOC_FL_PUNCH_HOLE), and Solaris provides fcntl(F_FREESP).

Detection
The -s option of the ls command shows the occupied space in blocks.
ls -ls sparse-file

Alternatively, the du command prints the occupied space, while ls prints the apparent size.
In some non-standard versions of du, the option --block-size=1 prints the occupied space in bytes instead of blocks, so that it can be compared to the ls output:
du --block-size=1 sparse-file
ls -l sparse-file

Also, the tool filefrag from e2fsprogs package can be used to show block allocation details of the file.
filefrag -v sparse-file

Copying
Normally the GNU version of cp is good at detecting whether a file is sparse, so
 cp sparse-file new-file
creates new-file, which will be sparse. However, GNU cp does have a --sparse option. This is especially useful if a file containing long zero blocks is saved in a non-sparse way (i.e. the zero blocks have been written to the storage media in full). Storage space can be conserved by doing:
 cp --sparse=always file1 file1_sparsed
Some cp implementations, like FreeBSD's cp, do not support the --sparse option and will always expand sparse files. A partially viable alternative on those systems is to use rsync with its own --sparse option instead of cp.  Unfortunately --sparse cannot be combined with --inplace.

Via standard input, sparse file copying is achieved as follows:
cp --sparse=always /proc/self/fd/0 new-sparse-file < somefile

See also
 Comparison of file systems

References

External links
 NTFS Sparse Files For Programmers
 Creating sparse files in Windows Server using fsutil
 Creating sparse files in Solaris using mkfile(1M)
 View the Size of the Sparse File of a Database Snapshot
 SEEK_HOLE or FIEMAP: Detecting holes in sparse files
 virtsync is a commercial solution to rsync's --sparse and --inplace issue.
 SparseChecker - Utility that allows to manage the sparse files on NTFS file system
 Phantom - a program to convert files to sparse files to reduce storage consumption
 ArchLinux Wiki: Sparse file

Computer files